Agony column may refer to:
The Agony Column, a novel by Earl Derr Biggers
A column of a newspaper that contains advertisements of missing relatives and friends
The Agony Column, an alternative title to the 1918 film The Blind Adventure
Advice column in a newspaper